Ray Hunter , is a Canadian politician in Newfoundland and Labrador, Canada. He represented the district of Grand Falls-Windsor-Green Bay South in the Newfoundland and Labrador House of Assembly until his retirement in 2015. He has sat as a member of the Progressive Conservative Party (PC) since being first elected in the 1999 provincial election, he has since been re-elected in the 2003 and 2007 elections.

In June 2011, former Conservative Member of Parliament Rex Barnes challenged him for the PC nomination but Hunter easily defeated him and was re-elected in the October election.

Electoral record 

|-

|-

|-

|NDP
|Clyde Bridger
|align="right"|418
|align="right"|11.25%
|align="right"|
|}

|-

|-

|-
 
|NDP
|John L. Whelan
|align="right"|192
|align="right"|5.07%
|align="right"|
|}

References

External links
Ray Hunter's PC Party biography

Progressive Conservative Party of Newfoundland and Labrador MHAs
Year of birth missing (living people)
Living people
21st-century Canadian politicians